The 41st annual Venice International Film Festival was held from 1 to 11 September 1984 under the direction of Gian Luigi Rondi. No Golden Lion for Lifetime Achievement was assigned. The main event of this edition was, out of competition, the premiere of Heimat, an almost 16 hours-long film directed by Edgar Reitz. Among the other titles showed out of competition there were Steven Spielberg's Indiana Jones and the Temple of Doom, Wolfgang Petersen's The NeverEnding Story and a restored version of Metropolis edited and scored by Giorgio Moroder. The retrospective was dedicated to Luis Buñuel.

Jury
The following people comprised the 1984 jury:
 Michelangelo Antonioni (head of jury) (Italy)
 Rafael Alberti (Spain) 
 Balthus (France)  
 Yevgeny Yevtushenko (Soviet Union)  
 Günter Grass (West Germany)  
 Joris Ivens (Holland)  
 Isaac Bashevis Singer (USA), 
 Erica Jong (USA)  
 Erland Josephson (Sweden)  
 Paolo and Vittorio Taviani (Italy) 
 Goffredo Petrassi (Italy)

Official selection

In competition

Out of competition
Among the other titles showed out of competition there were Steven Spielberg's Indiana Jones and the Temple of Doom, Wolfgang Petersen's The NeverEnding Story and a restored version of Metropolis edited and scored by Giorgio Moroder.

Autonomous sections

Venice International Film Critics' Week
The following feature films were selected to be screened as In Competition for this section:
 O pokojniku sve najlepse by Predrag Antonijevic (Yugoslavia)
 Beyond The Walls (Meachorei Hasoragim) by Uri Barbash (Israel)
 Wildrose by John Hanson (USA)
 Final Call (Unerreichbare Nähe) by Dagmar Hirtz (West Germany)
 Strikebound by Richard Lowenstein (Austria)
 Mosquito on the 10th Floor (Jukkai no mosukîto) by Yoichi Sai (Japan)
 End of the Miracle (A csoda vége) by János Vészi (Hungary)

Awards

Golden Lion
A Year of the Quiet Sun (Rok spokojnego słońca) by Krzysztof Zanussi
Silver Lion for Best First Film 
Sonatine by Micheline Lanctôt
Special Jury Prize:
Favorites of the Moon (Le favoris de la lune) by Otar Ioseliani
 Volpi Cup
 Best Actor - Naseeruddin Shah (Paar)
 Best Actress - Pascale Ogier (Full Moon in Paris)

References 

Edoardo Pittalis - Roberto Pugliese, Bella di Notte, August 1996
L'Europeo, Cinema in Laguna, SePtember 2008

External links 

Venice Film Festival 1984 Awards on IMDb

Venice
Venice
Venice
Venice Film Festival
Film
Venice International Film Festival